The 46th General Assembly of Prince Edward Island was in session from February 24, 1948, to March 31, 1951. The Liberal Party led by John Walter Jones formed the government.

Eugene Cullen was elected speaker. Forest W. Phillips replaced Cullen as speaker in 1949.

There were five sessions of the 46th General Assembly:

Members

Kings

Prince

Queens

Notes:

References
  Election results for the Prince Edward Island Legislative Assembly, 1947-12-11
 Normandin, PG Canadian Parliamentary Guide, 1965

Terms of the General Assembly of Prince Edward Island
1948 establishments in Prince Edward Island
1951 disestablishments in Prince Edward Island